Dead Presidents is a 1995 American crime film co-written, produced and directed by the Hughes Brothers. The film chronicles the life of Anthony Curtis (Larenz Tate), focusing on his teenage years as a high school graduate and his experiences during the Vietnam War as a Recon Marine. As he returns to his hometown in The Bronx, Curtis finds himself struggling to support himself and his family, eventually turning to a life of crime.

Dead Presidents is based partly on the real-life experiences of Haywood T. Kirkland (aka Ari S. Merretazon), whose true story was detailed in the book Bloods: An Oral History of the Vietnam War by Black Veterans  by Wallace Terry. Certain characters from the film are based on real acquaintances of Kirkland, who served time in prison after committing robbery in facepaint. The film also is loosely based on several incidents involving the Black Liberation Army, notably the Brink's armored truck robbery.

Plot 
In the North East section of the Bronx, New York during the spring of 1969, Anthony Curtis is about to graduate from high school, and decides to enlist in the U.S. Marine Corps rather than go to college. He is sent to Vietnam, leaving behind his middle-class family, his girlfriend Juanita, and small-time crook Kirby, who is like a second father. Anthony's close friend, Skip, later joins Curtis' Recon squad after deciding not to go to Hunter College and his other friend Jose, is drafted into the U.S. Army. Once in Vietnam, Curtis and his squad lose several fellow Marines during combat, and commit several atrocities of their own, such as executing enemy prisoners and beheading corpses for war trophies.

When Anthony returns to the Bronx in 1973, he finds returning to "normal" life impossible. He finds Skip now an Agent Orange victim and heroin addict, Jose is an amputee with a prosthetic hand and pyromaniac who now works as a postman at the James A. Farley Building, and Cleon, a religious but homicidal individual that was his squad’s Staff Sergeant, who is now a devoted minister in Mount Vernon, New York.

After being laid off from his job at a butcher shop, Anthony finds himself unable to support Juanita (who had an affair with a pimp while he was on duty) or his daughter. After an argument with Juanita, Anthony meets his girlfriend's sister, Delilah, who is now a member of the "Nat Turner Cadre", a revolutionary communist militant group. Anthony, Kirby, Skip, Jose, Delilah, and Cleon devise a plan to rob an armored car making a stop at the Noble Street Federal Reserve Bank of the Bronx.

The next day, the group strategically position themselves around the street, armed with weapons and disguised with face paint, ready to ambush the truck. The plan goes awry when Cleon is approached by a black NYPD officer (who was also a former Marine) who unknowingly stumbles upon the robbery, leading to Kirby being shot in the arm and Skip killing the officer when Cleon freezes up (a role reversal to what happens to Skip and Cleon earlier). At the same time, Anthony and Jose are spotted by the driver, causing a large shootout with the security guards.

Jose (a demolition expert in the army) plants an explosive device on the escaping truck to blow off the door, but instead it destroys the whole vehicle. Delilah saves Anthony's life by killing one of the guards. A second guard appears and gets into a shootout with Delilah; he shoots her multiple times killing her. As the group collects what cash they can from the burning wreckage, they flee and split up to escape the police. Jose gets cornered in an alley by an approaching police car. When Jose shoots the driver, he is hit by the car and killed as the police car crashes into a wall, crushing Jose.

Not long after the heist, Kirby hears that Cleon has been giving out $100 bills and has bought himself a new Cadillac that he can barely afford. Anthony drives over to Cleon's church to speak to him, only to find him being led out the front door in handcuffs by two detectives. Cleon gives up the other robbers as part of a plea bargain due to his remorse in the death of the earlier officer. NYPD officers storm Skip's apartment only to find that he has died of a heroin overdose. As Kirby and Anthony prepare to flee to Mexico, police raid the bar. Kirby tries to distract the officers to allow Anthony to flee, but it is to no avail, as multiple officers corner Anthony and arrest him.

Anthony is convicted by a judge. His lawyer asks the court to show mercy, as Anthony served his country faithfully in the Marines and earned a Silver Star. However, the judge was a Marine in World War II, and proclaims that Anthony has forgotten the values that the Marines have taught him and that the Vietnam War wasn't even a real war to begin with and had no purpose, before sentencing him to fifteen years to life. Anthony, furious at his sentence in spite of his years of service, throws a chair at the judge before being escorted away. The film ends with Anthony looking out the window of his prison bus.

Cast

Themes 
The film depicts the struggle of returning war veterans of color who are neglected by the US government and the mistreatment of Vietnam veterans. Many Black and Latino veterans of the Vietnam War were denied benefits, compensation, and recognition for their efforts in serving their country.

Production 
Principal photography commenced on October 31, 1994. The production filmed through the remainder of the year and into early February across a variety of locations, including location shoots Brooklyn and Mount Vernon, New York. Sound stages in Queens and Los Angeles served as interior locations. All Vietnam scenes were shot in Florida, with former celery farm Lee Ranch serving as the outdoor sets.

Reception 
Dead Presidents received mixed reviews from critics. Film review aggregator Rotten Tomatoes reports that 49% of critics gave the film a positive rating, based on 35 reviews with an average score of 5.8/10.

Todd McCarthy of Variety gave the film a positive review stating, "In all respects an extremely ambitious follow-up to their crackling debut, Menace II Society, the Hughes Brothers' mordant Dead Presidents may eventually box itself into a narrative dead end, but its muscular engagement of weighty themes and explosive situations makes it a powerful drama." Kenneth Turan of the Los Angeles Times called the film "both expected and surprising, familiar and yet somehow different. Made with fluid skill and a passion for storytelling, its tale of how the Vietnam War and American society affect a black Marine remains accessible while confounding expectations."

Caryn James of The New York Times felt the film "takes on much more than it can handle." Comparing the film with the Hughes Brother's previous film James said, "The Hugheses obviously knew the world and generation of Menace II Society better than the past of Dead Presidents, but that is only part of the problem. In Menace they trusted the audience more, immersing them in a violent world the film explained without condoning."

Roger Ebert of the Chicago Sun-Times gave the film a mixed 2.5 star review, and explained that the directing duo "have a sure sense of the camera, of actors, of the life within a scene. But they are not as sure when it comes to story and meaning, and here is a film that feels incomplete, as if its last step is into thin air. Scene by scene you feel its skill, but you leave the theater wondering about the meaning of it all." The early scenes were the best, according to Ebert, and the film "goes off the rails" in the final act.

Mark Kermode placed it at number two in his countdown of top five underrated films of all time.

Soundtracks

See also 
 List of hood films

References

External links 
 
 
 

1995 films
1990s crime drama films
American heist films
Caravan Pictures films
American crime drama films
Films scored by Danny Elfman
Films directed by the Hughes brothers
Films set in the 1960s
Films set in the 1970s
Films set in Brooklyn
Hollywood Pictures films
Hood films
American neo-noir films
Films about the United States Marine Corps
Vietnam War films
1995 drama films
Films about alcoholism
1990s English-language films
Films about post-traumatic stress disorder
1990s American films